On 28 March 1933, an Armstrong Whitworth Argosy II passenger aircraft, named City of Liverpool and operated by British airline Imperial Airways, crashed near Diksmuide, Belgium, after suffering an onboard fire; all fifteen people aboard were killed, making it the deadliest accident in the history of British civil aviation to that time. It has been suggested that this was the first airliner ever lost to sabotage, and in the immediate aftermath, suspicion centred on one passenger, Albert Voss, who seemingly jumped from the aircraft before it crashed.

Accident
The aircraft was employed on Imperial's regular London–Brussels–Cologne route, which it had flown for the previous five years. On this leg of the journey the plane was travelling from Brussels to London, which route would take it north from Brussels heading over Flanders before crossing the coast for the  flight across the English Channel and then making the brief traverse over the Kent countryside to land at Croydon Airport in Surrey.  The two-hour journey began, slightly delayed, just after 12:30 pm.

While flying over the fields of northern Belgium, the plane was seen by onlookers to catch fire before losing altitude and plunging into the ground. As the aircraft began its descent, a passenger was seen to exit the aeroplane and fall to earth without a parachute. He was later identified as Albert Voss, a German who had emigrated to the United Kingdom, where he practised as a dentist in Manchester.

Investigation and inquest
The subsequent investigation found that the fire had started towards the rear of the plane, in either the lavatory or the luggage area at the back of the cabin. No items recovered from the front portion of the wreckage showed any evidence of fire damage before the impact, nor was there any evidence of fire in the engines or fuel systems. The investigators narrowed the cause down to the firing of some combustible substance, either accidentally by a passenger or crew member or through vibration or some other natural occurrence, or deliberately by bombing.

At the inquest into Albert Voss's death at least one witness, his estranged brother, accused him of being culpable, claiming that Voss's business trips to the continent to buy anaesthetics masked a lucrative sideline in drug smuggling. This rumour had followed Voss for some time before his death and was alleged to have been the subject of investigations by the Metropolitan Police. Voss, according to his brother, was travelling aboard the aircraft together with his niece, and they were aware that the authorities were on to them. Under this theory, Voss sought to escape from the authorities by destroying the aircraft using various flammable substances to which his work gave him easy access and then bailing out in the confused circumstances, hoping that in the aftermath no one would notice one fewer body than there should have been. An autopsy showed that, other than some minor burns, Voss was unharmed before he exited the aircraft. The inquest jury eventually returned an open verdict – indicating that they believed his death may not have been accidental, but that they were unable, on the evidence before them, to come to a definite conclusion – rather than the verdict of accidental death the coroner attempted to direct them towards.

References

Airliner accidents and incidents with an unknown cause
Aviation accidents and incidents in 1933
Airliner accidents and incidents caused by in-flight fires
Aviation accidents and incidents in Belgium
Imperial Airways accidents and incidents
1933 in Belgium
1933 Imperial Airways Diksmuide crash
March 1933 events